Ashtrayhead is an album by the English group Ashtrayhead, released in 1997 (see 1997 in music).

The band's only album, it was released on 21 April 1997 in Europe by Dynamica, and on May 27, 1997, in the United States by Invisible Records. The original CD sleeve featured a heavily made-up Marc Heal with several hundred cigarettes glued to his head.

Track listing
"Ashtrayhead" (Heal) – 5:23
"Handyman" (Heal/Simonds) – 4:14
"Good Doggy" (Heal/Simonds) – 4:42
"Homemovies" (Heal/Simonds) – 4:54
"My Private Pornostar" (Heal) – 7:54
"Playmate" (Heal/Simonds) – 4:33
"Phone Call" (Heal/Simonds) – 4:15
"Godprawn" (Heal/Simonds) – 4:20
"Spooky Thoughts" (Heal) – 6:11
"Handyman EXTENDED" (Heal/Simonds) – 5:41
"Good Dubby" (Heal/Simonds) – 6:25
Published by Polygram Music / Copyright Control
except 1, 5 & 9 by Polygram Music

Credits
Gobhead: Heal
Proghead: Simonds
Axehead: Rapley
Knobhead: Atkins at the Spike
Breadhead: Blackaby at Ardent

Thanx to: All the Usual Suspects and notably Ian B (as ever), Paul Green, Doug Martin, Shep Ashton, Martin Atkins, Jeffrey Churchwell, Sean Roberts

Sleeved by Greg Jakobek @ Warsaw
Photography by Ian Jackson

References

External links
Ashtrayhead at Invisible Records
und mehr - Interview Ashtrayhead (4/98) (in German)

1997 albums
Dynamica albums
Industrial albums by English artists